Teen Titans Go! To the Movies is a 2018 American animated superhero comedy film based on the television series Teen Titans Go!, which is based on the DC Comics superhero team  of the same name. This film is directed by Peter Rida Michail and Aaron Horvath (in their feature directorial debuts) and written by Michael Jelenic and Horvath. The events of the film take place during the fifth season of the series. It is the second Warner Bros. Animation theatrical feature film to be based on a television series, following 1993's Batman: Mask of the Phantasm, in addition to being the first theatrical feature film to be based on a series airing on Cartoon Network since 2002's The Powerpuff Girls Movie. It features the voices of Greg Cipes, Scott Menville, Khary Payton, Tara Strong, and Hynden Walch reprising their respective roles from the series, while Will Arnett (who also produced the film) and Kristen Bell join the cast. The film follows the Teen Titans, who attempt to have a movie made about them in Hollywood while dealing with supervillain Slade, who was responsible for making blockbuster movies about superheroes undercover as a Hollywood director.

The film premiered in the BFI Southbank on July 22, 2018, and was theatrically released in the United States on July 27, by Warner Bros. Pictures. It grossed $52.1 million worldwide against a $10 million budget and received positive reviews from critics, which praised the stylized animation quality, cast, score, and screenplay.

Plot

In Jump City, the Teen Titans arrive to stop Balloon Man. When he fails to recognize them, the Teen Titans jump into a rap song to introduce themselves ("GO!") and become distracted, forcing the Justice League to intervene. They criticize the Titans for their childishness and inability to take their positions as superheroes seriously, while raising the fact that they do not have a feature-length film to prove their legitimacy as superheroes.

While at the premiere of Batman Again, the Titans' leader Robin is mocked by the audience after a misunderstanding leads him to assume that there would be a film about him. At the rest of the team's suggestion, Robin resolves that in order to get a film made about him and the Titans, they need an arch-nemesis. Nearby, a supervillain named Slade breaks into S.T.A.R. Labs to steal a crystal. The Titans arrive and attempt to stop him, but he swiftly defeats and insults them.

The next day, Beast Boy, Starfire, Cyborg, and Raven create a film to cheer up Robin, but he turns it off prematurely and declares that they will go to Hollywood to have a film made about them ("Upbeat Inspirational Song About Life"). Upon arriving at Warner Bros. Studios, they encounter director Jade Wilson, who is responsible for all the superhero films being made. She turns down the Titans' request to be in a film ("My Superhero Movie"), saying that the only way she would make one about them is if they were the only superheroes in the world. The Titans take her words literally, and go back in time to prevent the origins of the other superheroes ("Crystals" and "Back in Time"), but upon returning to the present, they discover that having done so erases the other heroes' existence and are forced to go back in time again and undo their blunder.

Slade next arrives at Wayne Tech to infuse the crystal's power and the Titans arrive to stop him, this time putting up an actual fight. They secure the crystal, but Slade escapes, resolving to split Robin from his teammates. 
 
The next day, Jade invites the Titans back to Hollywood and announces that she will make a movie about them due to their fight with Slade. While Robin is given a tour of the premises, Raven, Beast Boy, Starfire, and Cyborg venture out and cause mischief ("Shenanigans"). They find a device labeled "DOOMSDAY" and try to destroy it, but Jade arrives and explains that D.O.O.M.S.D.A.Y. is an acronym for a new streaming service for the new movie she is making. She resolves to drop the rest of the Titans from the film and make it solely about Robin, which he happily accepts, much to the consternation of his team, who wish him luck. Robin finishes making the movie, but begins to regret his decision and misses his friends.

During a scene shot on location inside Titans Tower, Jade is revealed to be Slade in disguise. He steals the crystal back and reveals to Robin that having made numerous superhero films was part of his plan to keep all the heroes busy while he stole technology from their cities and dimensions to build D.O.O.M.S.D.A.Y., a device that can  control minds and allow him to conquer the world. He destroys the entire Titans Tower, but Robin safely manages to escape the exploding building. In the aftermath of the wreckage, Robin calls his friends and apologizes to them, who make peace with him.

At the premiere of Robin: The Movie, the Titans arrive and unmask Slade, but Slade unleashes the crystal's power to control the other heroes and sends them after the Titans. Robin goes after Slade while the rest of the team leads off the heroes. However, Slade uses his new power to control Robin, and tells him to attack his friends. They show him the rest of the movie they made for him, causing Robin to come to his senses. Slade attempts to fight them with a giant robot, but the team uses a song ("GO! (Battle Remix)") to take out Slade, altogether while also destroying the crystal, snapping the other heroes out of their trance. They all congratulate the Titans for their heroic efforts with Robin admitting that he has learned to be himself without needing a movie.

In a post credits scene, the 2003 Titans said that they found a way back, thus creating a bridge to Teen Titans Go! vs. Teen Titans.

Voice cast

 Scott Menville as Robin, Batman's sidekick and the de facto leader of the Teen Titans who uses gymnastic skills, martial arts and various weapons to fight crime.
 Jacob Jeffries as Robin's singing voice for the song "My Superhero Movie".
 Hynden Walch as Starfire, a beautiful Tamaranian princess who has the ability to fire bright green-colored bolts of ultraviolet energy and green laser beams from both her hands and eyes as well as possessing superhuman strength and flight. She is also shown to have a villainous older sister known as Blackfire.
 Khary Payton as Cyborg, a cybernetic enhanced human cyborg and once a former athlete and football player who has the power of using a variety of weapons from his mechanical body as well as possessing superhuman strength. He is the oldest of the Teen Titans, Beast Boy's best friend and also a member of the Justice League.
 Tara Strong as Raven, a human sorceress who is secretly half-demon and has the ability to fly, use telekinesis, teleportation and magic as well as open portals. She is also the daughter of an inter-dimensional satanic-like demon called Trigon and a human named Arella and was originally born on Azarath, her former birthplace and home realm.
 Strong provides the vocal effects of Silkie, Starfire's pet mutated caterpillar who was formerly owned by Killer Moth.
 Greg Cipes as Beast Boy, a green-skinned humanoid, a member of the Teen Titans and Cyborg's best friend who is the youngest and comic relief of the group and has the power to shapeshift into various animals of all shapes and sizes.
 Will Arnett as Slade, a supervillain and Robin's nemesis.
 Kristen Bell as Jade Wilson, a famous filmmaker who the Teen Titans try to persuade to make a movie about them and is secretly Slade in disguise.
 Eric Bauza as Aquaman, a member of the Justice League and King of Atlantis. Bauza also voices Stan's assistant.
 Michael Bolton as Tiger
 Nicolas Cage as Superman, a member of the Justice League and survivor of Krypton. Cage was intended to play Superman in the cancelled film Superman Lives directed by Tim Burton.
 Joey Cappabianca as Plastic Man, a member of the Justice League.
 Greg Davies as Balloon Man, a balloon-themed supervillain.
 John DiMaggio as Guard, Synth Skate Voice
 Halsey as Wonder Woman, a member of the Justice League and Princess of Themyscira. She makes a reference to the 2017 film Wonder Woman.
 David Kaye as the Alfred trailer announcer, and the Inside Premiere announcer.
 Tom Kenny as Machine Voice
 Jimmy Kimmel as Batman, a member of the Justice League and Robin's father figure and mentor.
 Nicolas Cage's son Kal-El Cage voices the younger Bruce Wayne.
 Vanessa Marshall as Vault Voice
 Phil Morris as D.O.O.M.S.D.A.Y., a streaming device. Morris also voices the Red Carpet Announcer.
 Patton Oswalt as Atom, a member of the Justice League.
 Alexander Polinsky as Control Freak, a media-manipulating enemy of the Teen Titans.
 Meredith Salenger as Supergirl, the cousin of Superman.
 Dave Stone as Walter "Prof" Haley, leader of the Challengers of the Unknown.
 Fred Tatasciore as Jor-El, the late father of Superman. Tatasciore also voices a security guard.
 James Arnold Taylor as Shia LaBeouf
 Lil Yachty as Green Lantern, a member of the Justice League and Green Lantern Corps who made a reference to the 2011 film Green Lantern (commenting "We don't like to talk about it").
 Wil Wheaton as The Flash, a member of the Justice League.
 Stan Lee as himself in his only cameo in a DC Comics project.

Production
On September 25, 2017, Warner Bros. announced the film and its release date of July 27, 2018, with the show's cast reprising their roles. A month later, the film's title and teaser poster debuted, and it was announced that Will Arnett, who voices Batman in The Lego Movie franchise, and Kristen Bell had joined the cast. The film marks the first time Warner Bros. Animation has released a theatrical film since Warner Animation Group's formation in 2013 and also technically the first fully 2D animated theatrical feature from Warner Bros. Animation since The Iron Giant while the first 2D animated film to be presented by Warner Bros. Pictures since Clifford's Really Big Movie.

On March 12, 2018, it was announced that musicians Lil Yachty and Halsey were part of the cast, as Green Lantern and Wonder Woman, respectively, with Nicolas Cage revealed as Superman the same day. Cage himself was originally slated to portray Superman in Tim Burton's canceled Superman film, Superman Lives, in the 1990s. Jimmy Kimmel was announced to voice Batman in the film through an extended cut of the trailer.

Music

The Teen Titans Go! To the Movies soundtrack was released on July 20, 2018. The soundtrack consists of songs that the cast sing throughout the movie that serve mostly as musical pop culture references and parodies, and the musical score composed by Jared Faber.

 "GO!" – Hynden Walch, Tara Strong, Scott Menville, Khary Payton, Greg Cipes
 "My Superhero Movie" – Jacob Jeffries
 "Upbeat Inspirational Song About Life" – Michael Bolton, Hynden Walch, Tara Strong, Scott Menville, Khary Payton, Greg Cipes
 "Crystals" – David Gemmill and M A E S T R O
 "Shenanigans" – Peter Rida Michail and Khary Payton
 "GO! (Battle Remix)" – Hynden Walch, Khary Payton, Scott Menville, Tara Strong, Greg Cipes
 "GO! (Remix)" – Lil Yachty
 "Upbeat Inspirational Song About Life [Reprise]" – Michael Bolton
 "Welcome to Jump City" – Jared Faber
 "Balloon Man Invades" – Jared Faber
 "Check This Out" – Jared Faber
 "This Is Where They Make Movies" – Jared Faber
 "Slade Arch Nemesis Suite" – Jared Faber
 "Chasing Slade" – Jared Faber
 "Slade's Master Plan" – Jared Faber
 "Robin Misses The Titans" – Jared Faber
 "The Tower Collapses" – Jared Faber
 "Titans Save The World Suite" – Jared Faber
 "Slade Becomes Giant Robot" – Jared Faber
 "Justice League Returns/Saved By Titans" – Jared Faber
 "Star Labs/Doomsday Device" – Jared Faber
 "Worthy Arch Nemesis" – Jared Faber
 "Back To The Future Theme" – Alan Silvestri (arranged by Fred Kron)

Release
The film was released in theaters in the United States on July 27, 2018, by Warner Bros. Pictures and became generally available on November 23, 2018, followed by a United Kingdom bow a week later. It was released in Australian theaters on September 13, 2018. An early screening was held on June 22 at Vidcon 2018, for both badge members and YouTubers. The film was also shown at the San Diego Comic-Con International on July 20, 2018. DC Comics announced that Teen Titans Go! To the Movies held a watch event on November 22, 2018 and released Teen Titans Go! To the Movies for general availability on the next day. The film's theatrical release was preceded by #TheLateBatsby, a short film based on Lauren Faust's forthcoming DC Super Hero Girls television series. Teen Titans Go! To the Movies was generally available for download from MSDN and Technet on November 7 and for retail purchase from November 23, 2018. The film was set to make its network television premiere on TBS on September 12, 2020, but was removed from the schedule and replaced by an airing of Sherlock Gnomes for unknown reasons. The film made its official network television premiere on Cartoon Network on November 25, 2020.

Home media
Teen Titans Go! To the Movies was released on digital copy on October 9, 2018, and was released on DVD and Blu-ray on October 30, 2018.

Reception

Box office
Teen Titans Go! To the Movies has grossed $29.6 million in North America, and $22.3 million in other territories, for a total worldwide gross of $52 million, against a production budget of $10 million.

In the United States, Teen Titans Go! To the Movies was released alongside Mission: Impossible – Fallout, and was initially projected to gross around $14 million from 3,188 theaters in its opening weekend, with a chance to go as high as $19 million. However, after making $4.6 million on its first day (including $1 million from Thursday night previews), estimates were lowered to $10 million, and it ended up debuting to $10.5 million, finishing 5th at the box office.

Critical response
The site's critical consensus reads, "Teen Titans Go! To the Movies distills the enduring appeal of its colorful characters into a charmingly light-hearted adventure whose wacky humor fuels its infectious fun – and belies a surprising level of intelligence." Several critics have called the movie, "Deadpool for kids". On Metacritic, the film has a score of 69 out of 100 based on reviews from 25 critics, indicating "generally favorable reviews". Audiences polled by CinemaScore gave the film an average grade of "B+" on an A+ to F scale.

Laura Prudom of IGN gave the film a score of 8/10, calling it a "gleefully unhinged deconstruction of superhero tropes that isn't afraid to take aim at the rest of DC's cinematic roster". Owen Glieberman of Variety said "Teen Titans GO! is fun in a defiantly super way, and that's a recommendation." Frank Scheck of The Hollywood Reporter wrote that "Considering the somberness that afflicts so many DC universe releases, the tongue-in-cheek, albeit admittedly juvenile humor of Teen Titans Go! To the Movies should come as a welcome relief to fans."

David Betancourt of The Washington Post opined, "Teen Titans Go! To the Movies is a laugh-a-minute ride that hits you with the jokes from the very first frame. From the cute shots at Marvel Studios to the self-deprecating tone on the state of DC movies, you’ll leave the theater with a new set of superhero abs from laughing so hard."

Brandon Katz of The New York Observer said that the film is "a fun parody of sorts that gently skewers our superhero obsessed culture, and while there may be one too many gags thrown in there which can get a bit tiresome after awhile, it's an enjoyable movie for both kids and adults." Brian Tallerico of RogerEbert.com rated the film 3/4 stars, saying "It's not a film designed to break ground or even offer too much social commentary on the role of superheroes in modern culture. It's built with the primary goal of making you laugh and forget your problems for just under 90 minutes, and it does exactly that."

GameSpot's Chris Hayner, while finding fault with what he deemed excessive toilet humor and some dragging in the film, said that "In a superhero movie landscape where the world is constantly being destroyed by massive CGI abominations, this is a refreshing change... it doesn't forget how funny and exciting these types of movies can be."

Accolades

Sequel
An episode of Teen Titans Go! premiered about a month after the film's release. The episode, titled "Tower Renovation", was about the Titans attempting to rebuild Titans Tower after Slade destroyed it in the events of the film.

References

External links

 DC page
 Warner Bros. page
 
 

2018 animated films
2018 films
2010s American animated films
2010s animated superhero films
2018 action comedy films
2010s English-language films
2010s musical films
2010s superhero comedy films
American flash animated films
American action comedy films
American children's animated comedy films
American children's animated fantasy films
American children's animated musical films
American children's animated superhero films
Animated films about extraterrestrial life
Animated films about time travel
Animated films about friendship
Animated films based on animated series
Teen Titans
Demons in film
Depictions of Stan Lee on film
Films about Hollywood, Los Angeles
Films set in 2018
Films set on fictional planets
Teen Titans films
Metafictional works
Self-reflexive films
Warner Bros. animated films
Warner Bros. Animation animated films
Warner Bros. films
Animated superhero crossover films
Fiction about mind control
Films based on television series
Animated teen superhero comedy films
2018 directorial debut films
Teen Titans Go! (film series)
Films produced by Will Arnett
Films produced by Sam Register